Dribbble is a self-promotion and social networking platform for digital designers and creatives. It serves as a design portfolio platform, jobs and recruiting site and is one of the largest platforms for designers to share their work online. The company is a distributed company with no headquarters; all employees are remote workers.

History 

In 2009, Dan Cederholm and Rich Thornett beta-launched Dribbble as an invite-only site where designers shared what they were working on: “The name Dribbble came about from the dual metaphors of bouncing ideas and leaking your work.” The first  "Shot" (a small screenshot of a designer's work in progress) was posted by Cederholm on July 9, 2009. In March 2010, it was made publicly available with new members requiring invitations.

Over the years, features were added such as API integration, Attachments, Player Stats, and Pro (an elevated, paid profile). It launched a designer job board, then team accounts, a design podcast "Overtime", and a customizable portfolio product, "Playbook". Dribbble expanded its global reach for in-person designer meetings (“Meetups”), resulting in 142 Dribbble Meetups worldwide. By the end of 2016, its community grew to 486,771 members.

In January 2017, Dribbble was acquired by Tiny, a family of internet startup companies, and Zack Onisko was appointed CEO.  2017 saw its  first in-person designer conference: Hang Time,  since hosted in Boston (2017), Seattle (2018), Los Angeles (2018), and New York.

In April 2017, Dribbble acquired the freelancer platform Crew.

In 2018, the site added a video feature. The site also continued to expand its global reach with 144 meet-ups in 43 countries, with more than 8,000 designers in attendance. As of 2019, the firm's fully remote team is composed of 40 or more employees.  The site is now used in 195 countries worldwide and  sees 4+ million visitors each month.

Awards  

 Inc. 5000: Fastest-Growing Private Companies in America (2018 and 2019)
 Webby Awards: Honoree, Best Website – Community (2019)
 CSS Design Awards: Best UI Design, Best UX Design, Best Innovation (2019)
 Inc. 5000: Fastest-Growing Private Companies in America (2018)

References

External links
 

Art websites
Companies based in Salem, Massachusetts
Internet properties established in 2009